is a four-volume diary written by Ennin, a Japanese Buddhist monk in China during the ninth century.  He was one of eight Japanese Buddhists who studied in China at that time.  He wrote his diary while he went on a Buddhist pilgrimage to China for nine and a half years (838–847).  The books are translated into English as two volumes by Professor Edwin O. Reischauer of Harvard University under the title Ennin's Diary: The Record of a Pilgrimage to China in Search of the Law (Ronald Press, New York: 1955) and Ennin's Travels in T'ang China.  The first volume is a translation of Ennin's Diary.  The second volume, a discussion of Ennin's travels, includes materials from other sources.

Ennin's travel books are precious as historical sources, although they have some errors.  His book was the first written document about China and its life by a foreigner.  He did not write an evaluation of what he saw, but rather wrote about religious matters and Chinese life under the Tang dynasty.  His diary is a good source on the practice of popular  Buddhism in China.  He described ceremonies as well.  He brought back many sutras and mandalas to Japan.  He struggled in his travel during the Tang's persecution of Buddhism (842–846).

Another contribution on his books was about Korea, which records details of Korea's active trade with Northeastern China. Korea had a dominant role in trade between East China, Korea, and Japan.

References

  Reprinted, Angelico Press, 2020 , with a Foreword by Valerie Hansen

Buddhism studies books
Late Old Japanese texts
Mahayana texts
Pilgrimage accounts
Tendai
Travel books
Books about China
9th-century Buddhism
Books about Buddhism in the Heian period
9th-century Japanese books